Troublesome Night 12 is a 2001 Hong Kong horror comedy film produced by Nam Yin and directed by Yip Wai-ying. It is the 12th of the 20 films in the Troublesome Night film series.

Plot
Hong Kong beauty consultants Sun and Aki accept an offer to work at their company's new branch in Shenzhen. Their initial excitement turns into horror when they learn that their boss had tricked them: Their accommodation is a cheap hotel room rather than a new house, while the branch has only one staff, Yee. That night, Aki's boyfriend Bud Gay brings the three of them to a disco run by his friends, the Lai brothers. With help from the Lai brothers, Bud Gay and his cousin Bud Yan, they distribute flyers to attract customers to their branch.

One evening, a strange man called Mr Cheng shows up and requests their services for his wife. He wants them to go to his home because it is inconvenient for his wife to travel. Sun follows him home and promises to heal Mrs Cheng's face upon accepting a large sum from them. She does not know that the Cheng couple and their housekeeper are actually ghosts. When she tries to stop after the first session, she gets possessed by Mrs Cheng's ghost, who forces her to return and fulfil her end of the bargain. Aki notices that Sun is behaving strangely and learns from Yee that Sun is possessed.

In the meantime, Bud Yan reveals to the Lai brothers that their disco has attracted a large number of ghost patrons because they have unknowingly opened their disco during the Hungry Ghost Festival. They seek help from Bud Gay's mother, the expert ghostbuster Mrs Bud Lung, to “cleanse” the disco and save Sun from the Cheng couple.

Cast
 Law Lan as Mrs Bud Lung
 Angie Cheung as Sun
 May Kwong as Aki
 Benny Lai as Mr Cheng
 Tong Ka-fai as Bud Gay
 Ronnie Cheung as Bud Yan
 Mr Nine as Lai Chor-kau
 Onitsuka as Lai Chor-pat
 Cheung Chi as Mrs Cheng
 Ann Ho as Cheung Man-yee
 Alson Wong as Tony Chiu

External links
 
 

Hong Kong comedy horror films
2000s Cantonese-language films
2001 comedy horror films
2001 films
Troublesome Night (film series)
2000s Hong Kong films